Aganhyboma is a genus of Scarabaeidae or scarab beetles.

References 

Scarabaeidae genera